RepublicAir was a Mexican airline founded in 2004. It is based at Toluca International Airport, in the city of Toluca, Mexico. Republicair was banned from its operations by DGAC in April 2007, but as of July 2007 they returned and restarted operations with a single Boeing 737-200

Services
Charter flights for groups, incentives and congresses.  Scheduled flights started on December 15, 2006 to the following destinations:
 Tapachula
 Tepic
 Tijuana

and also charter flights to:
 Guatemala City, Guatemala

and other destinations in Central America.

Fleet
The Republicair main flightline fleet included the following aircraft (as of 8 November 2008) :
1 Airbus A320
3 Boeing 737-200
3 Boeing 737-300
3 Boeing 737-400
1 MD-83 (in white livery, does not appear in the airline website)

Other aircraft in the fleet include business aircraft, air taxi aircraft and helicopters.

References

External links

Republicair (not in service)
Republicair  (not in service)
Republicair Fleet
Republicair aircraft

Defunct airlines of Mexico
Airlines established in 2005
Airlines disestablished in 2009
Companies disestablished in 2009